The Como neighborhood is a historically African-American neighborhood located on the west side of Fort Worth, Texas. Como was named after Como, Italy. One of its most valuable residents was neighborhood activist Viola Pitts. The Como Lake was built in 1889. Originally the neighborhood was conceived as a resort. In the early 1900s Lillian Russell visited the resort and was impressed by it. The neighborhood newspaper, the Lake Como Weekly, was published under several titles between 1940 and 1986.

In the 1960s through 1990s the community struggled to prosper. However, with the West side of Fort Worth's economic boom, significant infrastructure improvements by the City of Fort Worth, and the efforts of many, the Como neighborhood is making significant strides in becoming a prosperous home for African-Americans, Hispanics, as well as many others.

Como history.

Como, Fort Worth

Schools

Elementary
Como Elementary School
Como Montessori School.

Middle
Leonard Middle School
Monnig Middle School

High schools
Arlington Heights High School
Western Hills High School

See also

List of Neighborhoods in Fort Worth, Texas

References

External links
Realtor Report

Neighborhoods in Fort Worth, Texas